Richard Earl Bush (December 23, 1924 – June 7, 2004) was a United States Marine master gunnery sergeant who received the Medal of Honor as a corporal for heroism on Okinawa during World War II.  On April 16, 1945, Cpl. Bush placed himself on a thrown enemy grenade, absorbing the force of the explosion, saving the lives of his fellow Marines and corpsmen. In World War II, twenty-seven Marines similarly used their bodies against thrown enemy grenades in order to save their comrades' lives.  Four of these Marines survived and were awarded the Medal of Honor — Richard Bush, Jacklyn H. Lucas, Carlton R. Rouh, and Richard K. Sorenson.

Early life
Bush was born in Glasgow, Kentucky on December 23, 1924. He worked for his father as a tractor driver on a tobacco farm and completed one year of high school.

World War II
 U.S. Marine Corps
He enlisted in the United States Marine Corps Reserve on September 22, 1942, in Bowling Green, Kentucky. He received his basic training at the Marine Corps Recruit Depot San Diego, California, and later was transferred to a replacement battalion at Camp Elliott, California, for further training as an armorer.

Marine Raiders
He served with the Marine Corps Raiders in the Pacific. While with the "Raiders" he was promoted to corporal.

Okinawa
On April 16, 1945, Corporal Bush, was serving in the 1st Battalion, 4th Marine Regiment, 6th Marine Division as a rifle company squad leader when he led his men in a charge against an enemy stronghold during the final assault against Mount Yaetake in northern Okinawa. During that action, he was seriously wounded and evacuated to a nearby medical aid area for treatment. While at this position, an enemy grenade was hurled among the navy corpsmen and wounded Marines including himself. He immediately took and placed the grenade under himself saving his comrades lives. He survived the blast with severe wounds, losing several fingers and the sight in one eye.

Post war
Medal of Honor
On October 4, 1945, President Harry S. Truman, in a White House ceremony, presented Cpl. Bush with the Medal of Honor for "conspicuous gallantry and intrepidity at the risk of his life above and beyond the call of duty." He was also awarded a second Purple Heart Medal (gold 5/16 inch star) for wounds received on Okinawa.

Veterans counselor
In the years following the war, Bush worked for the Veterans Administration until 1972 as a counselor helping veterans file claims and earned numerous civilian awards for his efforts to aid other veterans despite constant problems with his one functioning eye, a holdover from his World War II wounds.

Death
Bush died of a heart ailment at the age of 79 on June 7, 2004, in Waukegan, Illinois.

He is buried at Ascension Catholic Cemetery Libertyville, Illinois. His grave can be found in Section 7, Block 10, Lot 63.

Medal of Honor citation

Military decorations & awards
Medal of Honor
Purple Heart Medal with gold 5/16 inch star
Combat Action Ribbon
American Campaign Medal
Asiatic-Pacific Campaign Medal with bronze service star
World War II Victory Medal

See also

List of Medal of Honor recipients
List of Medal of Honor recipients for World War II

References

Further reading

External links

1924 births
2004 deaths
United States Marine Corps personnel of World War II
United States Marine Corps Medal of Honor recipients
Marine Raiders
United States Marine Corps non-commissioned officers
World War II recipients of the Medal of Honor
United States Marine Corps reservists